The debut self-titled album by an instrumental jam band supergroup The Word. The musicians: Robert Randolph (pedal steel guitar), John Medeski (keyboards), and the three members of North Mississippi Allstars - Luther Dickinson (electric guitar), Cody Dickinson (drums, washboard), and Chris Chew (bass guitar).

Track listing
 "Joyful Sounds" – 	3:45
 "Call Him by His Name" – 	4:11
 "Blood on that Rock" – 	3:22
 "Without God" – 	6:51
 "Waiting on My Wings" – 	8:19
 "At the Cross" – 	2:40
 "I'll Fly Away" – 	7:19
 "I Shall Not Be Moved" – 	2:37
 "Keep Your Lamp Trimmed and Burning" – 	2:02
 "Untitled" – 	6:08
 "Joyful Sounds Reprise" - 0:49 (This track is hidden, or unlisted, on the original CD release.)

Contributing Artists
John Medeski, Robert Randolph, North Mississippi Allstars

2001 albums